Robin Bertrand (born 15 March 2003) is a French tennis player.

Bertrand has a career high ATP singles ranking of 466 achieved on 3 October 2022. He also has a career high ATP doubles ranking of 495 achieved on 29 August 2022.  Bertrand has won 2 ITF Singles tournament as well as 3 ITF doubles tournaments.

Bertrand made his ATP main draw debut at the 2022 Open Sud de France after receiving a wildcard into the doubles main draw with Antoine Hoang.

Challenger and Futures finals

Singles: 6 (2–4)

References

External links

2003 births
Living people
French male tennis players
Sportspeople from Nîmes